The 2021 LPGA of Korea Tour was the 44th season of the LPGA of Korea Tour, the professional golf tour for women operated by the Korea Ladies Professional Golf' Association.

Schedule
Below is the schedule for the 2021 season. "Date" is the ending date for the tournament. The number in parentheses after winners' names show the player's total number wins in official money individual events on the LPGA of Korea Tour, including that event.

Events in bold are majors.

References

External links
 

2021
2021 in women's golf
2021 in South Korean sport